Falzonmay refer to:

Alby Falzon (born 1945), Australian surf filmmaker, photographer and publisher
Antonio Falzon (16th century), Maltese architect and military engineer
Candice Falzon (now Candice Warner, born 1985), Australian ironwoman, surf life saver and model
Charles Falzon (born 1957), Canadian entertainment executive, dean of the Creative School at Toronto Metropolitan University
Charlie Falzon, Canadian soccer player
Dan Falzon (born 1972), Australian actor of Maltese descent, plays Rick Alessi on the TV soap opera Neighbours
Daniel Falzon (born 1994), motorcycle racer
Dyson Falzon (born 1986), footballer
Janelle Falzon (born 1981), Australian Paralympic swimmer
Joey Falzon (born 1969), footballer and manager
Michael Falzon (actor) (1972–2020), Australian actor and singer
Michael Falzon (politician) (born 1961), member of the Maltese parliament
Nazju Falzon (1813–1865), Maltese priest, beatified in 2001
Stéphanie Falzon (born 1983), French hammer thrower

Maltese-language surnames